Bruno Boterf is a contemporary French tenor, specialising in Baroque and early music.

Biography 
Holder of the Certificate of Aptitude for Ancient Music, Boterf has taught at the RRC of Tours, the Royal Conservatory of Liège and the Conservatoire national supérieur de musique et de danse de Lyon where he has been a singing teacher specialized in early music. He regularly teaches courses and master classes on singing and Renaissance music polyphony at conservatories and polyphonic centres. 
   
He is regularly called upon to lead projects involving singers and instrumentalists in the pre-baroque and baroque repertoire (sacred music by Henry Du Mont with the choir of Namur, motets and psalms by Praetorius, Vespers by Monteverdi, Bach's cantatas and Mass in B minor). This pedagogical practice led him to create the Ensemble Ludus Modalis, made up of a dozen singers A capella, whose repertoire mainly covers the period of sacred music from the Renaissance and early Baroque periods.

Boterf has recorded many disks both for the following companies Harmonia Mundi, Alpha, Erato Records, CBS, Auvidis and  Ramée with the Ensemble Ludus Modalis and also Ricercar for the first two components of an Henry Du Mont (1610-1684) project.

Selected discography 
With A Doi tenori (and Gilles Ragon)
 1999: Giacomo Carissimi and Girolamo Frescobaldi: Duetti da chiesa nella Roma del Primo seicento (Label: L'empreinte digitale)

With Akadêmia
 1991: Claudio Monteverdi: Vespro della beata vergine 
 1993: Francesco Cavalli: Missa pro defunctis
 1994: Palestrina: Vergine bella: motets et madrigaux

With the Ensemble Clément-Janequin at Harmonia Mundi
 1984: Heinrich Schütz:  the Seven Last Words
 1988: Clément Janequin: la Chasse et autres chansons
 1988: Josquin Desprez: Chansons 
 1989: Pierre de La Rue: Messe L'homme armé - Requiem
 1992: Roland de Lassus: Chansons
 1994: Une fête chez Rabelais
 1994: Chansons sur des poèmes de Ronsard
 2000: Psaumes et chansons de la Réforme
 2003: Antoine Brumel : Messe et ecce terrae motus

With Les Arts florissants
 1990: Marc-Antoine Charpentier: Le Malade imaginaire

With Georges Guillard
 1996: Jehan Alain, vocal and instrumental works (vol. 2) (ARION, ARN 68321). Orphée d’Or, Grand Prix de l’Académie du Disque Lyrique 1996

With the Chœur de chambre de Namur as musical director
 2009: Henry Du Mont: Cantica sacra (Label Ricercar)
 2011: Henry Du Mont: Pour les Dames religieuses (Label Ricercar)

With the Chœur de chambre de Namur direction Jean Tubéry
 2008: Marc-Antoine Charpentier: Te Deum

With Les Sacqueboutiers of Toulouse
 1997: Giovanni Martino Cesare: Musicali Melodie (Label Accord)

With the William Byrd's European ensemble, direction Graham Reilly
 2007: Giacomo Carissimi : Jephte  Music in Roma circa 1640 (Label: Passacaille)

With the orchestre Les Passions  direction Jean Marc Andrieu
 2008: Jean Gilles: Requiem (Label Ligia Digital)
 2010: Jean Gilles : Lamentations (Label Ligia Digital)

With the Ensemble Ludus Modalis direction Bruno Boterf 
 2004: An improvised mass: Une messe pour la Saint-Michel et tous les saints anges with Freddy Eichelberger and Michel Godard. (Label: Alpha)
 2007: Paschal de L'Estocart: Sacrae Cantiones: songs, ode, psalms and motets from 3 to 7 voices Diapason d'or (Ramée)
 2010: Claude Le Jeune: Dix Psaumes de David de 1564 Diapason d'or (March 2011) (Ramée)
 2011: Giovanni Pierluigi da Palestrina: Stabat mater 
 2011: Roland de Lassus: Biographie Musicale Année de Jeunesse (Label: Musique en Wallonie)
 2013: Guillaume Costeley: Mignonne allons voir si la rose (Ramée)

References

External links 
 Bruno Boterf on Toulouse Les Orgues
 Bruno Boterf on France Musique
 Bruno Boterf ténor on "Les Passions"
 Bruno Boterf on Valmalete.com
 Bruno Boterf on Foremi.fr
 Circum 1570, with the Ludus Modalis ensemble, dir. Bruno Boterf on France Musique

French tenors
French male singers
French music educators
Baroque music
Early music
Academic staff of the Royal Conservatory of Liège
Year of birth missing (living people)
Living people